Toga is an island in the Torres group, within the Torba Province of Vanuatu.

Geography
Toga Island is the most southern of the Torres Islands. The island's size is 6 km by 4.5 km. The estimated terrain elevation above sea level is 104 meters. Toga is surrounded by a narrow fringing reef quickly dropping off into deep water. The summit of the island is Mt Lemeura (locally Lēmere ) located on the western side of the island. The climate on Toga is humid tropical. The average annual rainfall is about 4000 mm. The island is subject to frequent cyclones and earthquakes.

Population
Toga is the most populated island in the Torres Islands, with about 250 people. They speak the Toga dialect of the Lo-Toga language. The population lives in two villages: Liqal  and Litew . An ancient village, now abandoned, was called Qururetaqō .

Fauna 
Barn owls are known to live in the area. Many samples of the owl's bones were found in a cave in Toga, which were reviewed by scientists. Their prey were geckos and rats.

Name
The name Toga  comes from the Mota language, which was used as the primary language of the Melanesian Mission. Locally, the island is called Toge  in Lo-Toga and in Hiw. Both these names come from a Proto-Torres-Banks form *Toɣa.

References

Torba Province
Islands of Vanuatu
Archipelagoes of the Pacific Ocean